Elections to Lancashire County Council were held in May 2001 on the same day as the 2001 United Kingdom general election. The Labour party held overal control of the council.

Results

Burnley

Chorley

Fylde

Hyndburn

Lancaster

Pendle

Preston

Ribble Valley

Rossendale

South Ribble

West Lancashire

Wyre

References

2001
2001 English local elections
2000s in Lancashire
May 2001 events in the United Kingdom